Saint-Omer Cathedral (Cathédrale Notre-Dame de Saint-Omer) is a Roman Catholic former cathedral, a minor basilica, and a national monument of France, located in Saint-Omer. It was formerly the seat of the Bishop of Saint-Omer, but the see was not restored after the French Revolution, being instead absorbed into the Diocese of Arras under the Concordat of 1801. The church is still commonly referred to as the "cathedral" however.

History 
Originally a modest chapel from the 7th century, the church was built on the site around 1052. It was damaged around 1200 by a fire.

The choir, the ambulatory and the radiant chapels were then rebuilt, and in 1263 the transept was built. Work progressed slowly and spread from the 13th to the 16th century. Afterwards the church became collegiate.

The southern transept was extended from 1375 to 1379, and the nave was rebuilt. The lateral chapels of the nave date from 1386 to 1403. The oldest chapels were built in the south. The central nave was completed only in 1473, and its vaults in 1506.

From 1449 to 1472, Jehan de Meldre, prime contractor, proceeded to extend the north cross-section of the transept. At that time the tower to the west which had remained Romanesque was consolidated and enhanced.

From 1473 to 1521, the western tower was built around the Romanesque tower. It was re-dressed and decorated in the style of the abbey church of Saint-Bertin (built between 1431 and 1500). The sculptures of the western portal were realized from 1511 to 1515, by the sculptors of Bruges Jean and Josse Van der Poele.

The arrow above the crossing dates from 1486.

In 1553, the nearby town of Thérouanne, where the bishopric of Artois was located, was totally razed by the troops of Charles V, during a conflict which opposed it to the King of France Henry II. Salt was symbolically spread over the city floor.

In the years that followed, it was decided to share the diocese of Thérouanne, in order to respect the borders between the kingdom of France and the Spanish Netherlands. Thus was created in 1559 the diocese of Saint-Omer and the collegiate Notre-Dame became cathedral in 1561.

External links
 Location of the cathedral
 Saint-Omer Cathedral at The Planet's Cathedrals

Roman Catholic cathedrals in France
Churches in Pas-de-Calais
Basilica churches in France
Saint-Omer
Monuments historiques of Pas-de-Calais